Juliette Wytsman (née Trullemans; 14 July 1866 – 8 March 1925) was a Belgian impressionist painter. She was married to painter Rodolphe Wytsman. Her paintings are in the collections of several museums in Belgium.

Life 
Wytsman was born as Juliette Trullemans on 14 July 1866 in Brussels in Belgium.

She first studied under Henri Hendrickx at the Bischoffsheim Institute in Brussels.

At Capeinick's workshop, she met painter Rodolphe Wytsman. He was a founding member of Les XX and introduced her to this circle of avant-garde artists. They married in 1886 and moved to Linkebeek, near Brussels, in 1892. During World War I, they fled Belgium and lived in Rotterdam in the Netherlands.

Wytsman died on 8 March 1925, at the age of 58, in Ixelles in Belgium.

Painting 
Wytsman was an impressionist painter of landscapes and gardens.

Wytsman exhibited her work at the Palace of Fine Arts at the 1893 World's Columbian Exposition in Chicago, Illinois.

The Royal Museum of Fine Arts in Antwerp, the Royal Museums of Fine Arts of Belgium in Brussels, and the Museum of Fine Arts in Ghent have paintings of Wytsman in their collections.

References

External links 
 

1866 births
1925 deaths
Artists from Brussels
Belgian Impressionist painters
19th-century Belgian women artists
20th-century Belgian women artists